The MV Sinar Kudus hijacking was a maritime event that began on 16 March 2011 with four pirates in the Indian Ocean seizing the cargo ship MV Sinar Kudus  east of Somali coast. The siege ended after a rescue effort by the Indonesian Navy on 1 May 2011. It was the first pirate seizure of an Indonesian merchant ship off the Somali coast.

Background
On 16 March 2011, an Indonesian merchant ship, MV Sinar Kudus, was carrying nickel ore from South Sulawesi to Rotterdam when it was hijacked by Somali pirates in the Red Sea. After negotiations, the ship owner agreed to a ransom demand and restored the ship and crew to Indonesian authorities. It was then hijacked a second time by another group of pirates; after signalling "mayday" the ship's crew were supported by a group of Denjaka and Kopassus from KRI Abdul Halim Perdanakusuma which secured the ship. A further group of Denjaka and Kopassus were deployed using a Bo 105 helicopter to strafe the pirates, all of whom were killed.

There were plans and preparations for an amphibious landing on Somalia by the Indonesian commanders if the hostages had been brought ashore, but as the hostages and ship were rescued at sea, the plan was not executed.

Notes

2011 in Indonesia
2011 in military history
2011 in Somalia
Hijacking
Indonesian Navy
Maritime incidents in 2011
Military operations involving Indonesia
Piracy in Somalia